Łowin may refer to the following places in Poland:
Łowin, Lower Silesian Voivodeship (south-west Poland)
Łowin, Kuyavian-Pomeranian Voivodeship (north-central Poland)

See also 
 Lowin (surname)